The Slap is an American drama television miniseries, which aired on NBC from February 12 to April 2, 2015. It is an adaptation of the Australian series of the same name, which was based on Christos Tsiolkas' 2008 novel of the same name. Each episode tells the events of the aftermath of a birthday party from the perspective of a different character. Jon Robin Baitz wrote the teleplay and Lisa Cholodenko directed the pilot episode.

Plot
The miniseries revolves around the aftermath of a birthday party for a middle-aged city employee where Harry Apostolou slaps someone else's misbehaving child, Hugo, after he attempts to hit another child with a bat and kicks Harry in the leg. Hugo's mother, Rosie, insists on criminal charges, claiming that Harry's slap has caused Hugo PTSD. Though Rosie's diagnosis is later undermined when Hugo mentions how much he misses seeing Harry, the case slowly makes its way to court. Each episode tells the story from the perspective of a different character.

Cast

 Peter Sarsgaard as Hector Apostolou, a 40-year-old assistant deputy commissioner
 Thandie Newton as Aisha Apostolou, Hector's wife and a clinic director
 Ashley Aufderheide as Melissa Apostolou, daughter of Hector and Aisha
 Khalid Alzouma as Adam Apostolou, older brother of Melissa
 Uma Thurman as Anouk Latham, Hector's childhood friend and a television executive producer
 Dylan Schombing as Hugo Weschler, the receiver of the titular slap
 Melissa George as Rosie Weschler, mother of Hugo, the slappee
 Thomas Sadoski as Gary Weschler, father of Hugo, the slappee
 Zachary Quinto as Harry Apostolou, Hector's cousin, a rare-auto dealer and the deliverer of the titular slap
 Marin Ireland as Sandi Apostolou, Harry's wife
 Owen Tanzer as Rocco Apostolou, Harry's pre-teen son
 Sofia Regan as Melody, an employee of Harry's
 Brian Cox as Manolis Apostolou, Hector's father
 Maria Tucci as Koula Apostolou, Hector's mother
 Michael Nouri as Thanasis Korkoulis, Harry's attorney
 Makenzie Leigh as Connie, a babysitter who watches Hector and Aisha's children
 Lucas Hedges as Ritchie Joanou (née Collins), Connie's best friend
 Ellen Adair as Bridget Saltire, the ADA assigned to the case
 Penn Badgley as Jamie, Anouk's much younger actor boyfriend
 Molly Price as Fiona Collins, Ritchie's mother
 Blythe Danner as Virginia Latham, Anouk's mother
 Victor Garber as the narrator (voice)

Production
The miniseries was filmed on location in New York City (substituting for the novel's setting of Melbourne) and features Melissa George, who also played the role of Rosie in the original 2011 Australian adaptation of The Slap novel. Direction was by Michael Morris, Lisa Cholodenko, and Ken Olin. The series was written by Jon Robin Baitz, Walter F. Parkes, and Christos Tsiolkas. Costumes were designed by Jennifer von Mayrhauser and art direction was by Alison Ford. Mary-Louise Parker was originally cast as Anouk, but she had to drop out due to pneumonia and was replaced by Uma Thurman.

Episodes

Reception
NBC's The Slap has a 67% on Rotten Tomatoes—according to the site’s critical consensus, “Though the characters verge on stereotypes, they are aptly executed by The Slap's bright cast, allowing the show's topical themes to shine through in a provocative, meaningful way.” On Metacritic, the show has a 62 rating based on 33 reviews, indicating "generally favorable reviews".

References

External links

2015 American television series debuts
2015 American television series endings
2010s American drama television miniseries
American television series based on Australian television series
English-language television shows
NBC original programming
Television shows based on Australian novels
Television series by Matchbox Pictures
Television series by Universal Television
Television series created by Walter F. Parkes